Danbury United is an American soccer club based in Danbury, Connecticut. The team is an arm of the Portuguese Cultural Center, a group that allows the large Portuguese-American population of Connecticut to stay in touch with their roots. The "open" team plays in the Connecticut Soccer League, the top state league in Connecticut.

The team qualified for the 2007 Lamar Hunt U.S. Open Cup and lost in the first round, but not without giving the professional Western Mass Pioneers a scare by taking them to extra time.

2011 USOC roster

References

External links 
 Danbury United FC at the Portuguese Cultural Center website.

Soccer clubs in Connecticut
2003 establishments in Connecticut
Association football clubs established in 2003
Danbury, Connecticut
Sports in Fairfield County, Connecticut